Tainan Theological College and Seminary (TTCS) is a private Presbyterian educational institution in Tainan, Taiwan. It is one of three Presbyterian Church in Taiwan (PCT) theological schools that trains students for ministry in the PCT, along with Taiwan Seminary and Central Taiwan Theological College and Seminary.

Tainan Seminary is one of several PCT institutions in Tainan, along with a middle school, girls' school, Chang-Jung Christian University, and Sin-Lau Hospital.

History 
Founded in 1876 in Taiwan Prefecture by Thomas Barclay, a missionary from Scotland, who served as its first principal until he retired in 1925. The institution was closed in 1940 under the Japanese Imperial government, but reopened in 1949 with Shoki Coe as its principal. In the modern period, under several principals (Shoki Coe, C.S. Song, and Loh I-to), Tainan Seminary has become famous for its contextual theology.

Tainan Theological College and Seminary as of early 2020 has twelve full-time faculty members. The school offers degrees in divinity (M.Div., D.Min.), theology, church music, and social work, as well as continuing education programs for clergy and lay members.

Former principals 

Thomas Barclay (1875–1925)
W. E. Montgomery (1925–1940)
Shoki Coe (1949–1965), formerly the director of the Theological Education Fund of the World Council of Churches
C. S. Song (1965–1970)
Loh I-to (1995–2002), an honorary fellow of the Centre for the Study of Christianity in Asia, Trinity Theological College, Singapore

Notable faculty/alumni
 Kao Chun-ming, presbyterian
Wang Hsien-Chih (1941–1996), Professor of Theology

References

Universities and colleges in Tainan
Educational institutions established in 1876
1876 establishments in China